{{DISPLAYTITLE:C2H3FO}}
The molecular formula C2H3FO (molar mass: 62.04 g/mol, exact mass: 62.0179 u) may refer to:

 Acetyl fluoride
 Fluoroacetaldehyde